"Kissing You" is the third single by South Korean girl group Girls' Generation, from their debut album, Girls' Generation (2007).  Released in early 2008, the single hit number one on both SBS' The Music Trend and Mnet's M! Countdown.<ref>{{cite web|last=Kim|first=Hyeong-wu|url=http://isplus.joins.com/article/article.html?aid=892117|archive-url=https://archive.today/20120710165806/http://isplus.joins.com/article/article.html?aid=892117|url-status=dead|archive-date=July 10, 2012|title=소녀시대 인기가요 이어 엠카도 1위 등극 (Girls' Generation Hits#1 on M! Countdown After Topping The Music Trend)|publisher=Jcube Interactive|work=ISPlus, Newsen| date=February 15, 2008|accessdate=March 8, 2010|language=Korean}}</ref> The song was also the "Song of the Month" in February 2008 on KBS' Music Bank.

Music video
The music video featured a cameo from Super Junior's Donghae as the shared love interest. The video followed a candy theme, with the group members dressed in white and dancing whilst holding a lollipop (both concepts that also feature in live performances of the song, including covers by other groups.) The music video was released on January 14, 2008.

Rhythmer Volume 1 remix single
In January 2008, it was announced that people could submit their remixes of "Kissing You" to a website for a chance to have them officially released. The four chosen remixes were then digitally released in March 2008. The Skool Rock Remix Version, the top choice in the competition, was included in the re-release of their debut album, Baby Baby (2008).

Track listing
 Digital download
 "Kissing You" – 03:18
 Kissing You – Rhythmer Remix, Volume 1
 "Kissing You" (Skool Rock Remix) (by 정구현) – 03:06
 "Kissing You" (House Remix) (by 기현석) – 02:58
 "Kissing You" (Groovy Candy Remix) (by Philtre) – 02:57
 "Kissing You" (Funk Remix) (by shoon) – 03:21

Awards and nominations
 Mnet 20's Choice Awards: Hot Sweet Music Award

 Music programs awards 

Covers
The song has been covered by other K-Pop groups multiple times, including live on Korean music shows as part of special stages:
 By Wonder Girls on the July 4, 2008 edition of Music Bank. This was one half of a song trade where both groups covered one song by the other group, with Girls' Generation also covering Tell Me on the same show.
 By SM labelmates F(x), in conjunction with Seohyun and Sooyoung, on the New Year's Day 2010 edition of Music Bank. Jessica's younger sister Krystal, a member of F(x) since their debut, sang Jessica's parts.
 By Lovelyz on the May 19, 2016 edition of M Countdown''.
By Twice's Dahyun, Red Velvet's Yeri, Lovelyz's Kei, GFriend's Umji, Oh My Girl's Arin, (G)I-dle's Yuqi on the 2018 edition of KBS Gayo Daechuje

References

Songs about kissing
2008 singles
Dance-pop songs
Girls' Generation songs
SM Entertainment singles
Korean-language songs
2008 songs